

This is a list of the 64 hexagrams of the I Ching, or Book of Changes, and their Unicode character codes.

This list is in King Wen order. (Cf. other hexagram sequences.)

Hexagram 1 

Hexagram 1 is named  (qián), "Force". Other variations include "the creative", "strong action", "the key", and "god". Its inner (lower) trigram is ☰ ( qián) force = heaven, and its outer (upper) trigram is identical.

Hexagram 2 

Hexagram 2 is named  (kūn), "Field". Other variations include "the receptive", "acquiescence", and "the flow". Its inner (lower) trigram is ☷ ( kūn) field = earth, and its outer (upper) trigram is identical.

Hexagram 3 

Hexagram 3 is named  (zhūn), "Sprouting". Other variations include "difficulty at the beginning", "gathering support", and "hoarding". The meaning of "屯" is collect, store up, stingy, and stationing troops. Its inner (lower) trigram is ☳ ( zhèn) shake = thunder, and its outer (upper) trigram is ☵ ( kǎn) gorge = water.

Hexagram 4 

Hexagram 4 is named  (méng), "Enveloping". Other variations include "youthful folly", "the young shoot", and "discovering". Its inner (lower) trigram is ☵ ( kǎn) gorge = water, and its outer (upper) trigram is ☶ ( gèn) bound = mountain.

Hexagram 5 

Hexagram 5 is named  (xū), "Attending". Other variations include "waiting", "moistened", and "arriving". Its inner (lower) trigram is ☰ ( qián) force = heaven, and its outer (upper) trigram is ☵ ( kǎn) gorge = water.

Hexagram 6 

Hexagram 6 is named  (sòng), arguing, dispute, litigation, conflict and "lawsuit". Its inner (lower) trigram is ☵ ( kǎn) gorge = water, and its outer (upper) trigram is ☰ ( qián) force = heaven.

Hexagram 7 

Hexagram 7 is named  (shī), "Leading". Other variations include "the army" and "the troops". Its inner (lower) trigram is ☵ ( kǎn) gorge = water, and its outer (upper) trigram is ☷ ( kūn) field = earth.

Hexagram 8 

Hexagram 8 is named  (bǐ), "Grouping". Other variations include "holding together" and "alliance". Its inner (lower) trigram is ☷ ( kūn) field = earth, and its outer (upper) trigram is ☵ ( kǎn) gorge = water.

Hexagram 9 

Hexagram 9 is named  (xiǎo xù), "Small Accumulating", "domestication" "the taming power of the small", "small harvest", "minor restraint" and "small livestock". Its inner (lower) trigram is ☰ ( qián) force = heaven, and its outer (upper) trigram is ☴ ( xùn) ground = wind.

Hexagram 10 

Hexagram 10 is named  (lǚ), "Treading". Other variations include "treading (conduct)" and "continuing". Its inner (lower) trigram is ☱ ( duì) open = swamp, and its outer (upper) trigram is ☰ ( qián) force = heaven.

Hexagram 11 

Hexagram 11 is named  (tài), "Pervading", “smooth going", "peace" and "greatness". Its inner (lower) trigram is ☰ ( qián) force = heaven, and its outer (upper) trigram is ☷ ( kūn) field = earth.

Hexagram 12 

Hexagram 12 is named  (pǐ), "Obstruction". Other variations include "standstill (stagnation)" and "selfish persons". Its inner (lower) trigram is ☷ ( kūn) field = earth, and its outer (upper) trigram is ☰ ( qián) force = heaven.

Hexagram 13 

Hexagram 13 is named  (tóng rén), "Concording People". Other variations include "fellowship with men" and "gathering men". Its inner (lower) trigram is ☲ ( lí) radiance = fire, and its outer (upper) trigram is ☰ ( qián) force = heaven.

Hexagram 14 

Hexagram 14 is named  (dà yǒu), "Great Possessing". Other variations include "possession in great measure" and "the great possession". Its inner (lower) trigram is ☰ ( qián) force = heaven, and its outer (upper) trigram is ☲ ( lí) radiance = fire.

Hexagram 15 

Hexagram 15 is named  (qiān), "Humbling". Other variations include "modesty". Its inner (lower) trigram is ☶ ( gèn) bound = mountain, and its outer (upper) trigram is ☷ ( kūn) field = earth.

Hexagram 16 

Hexagram 16 is named  (yù), "Providing-For". Other variations include "enthusiasm" and "excess". Its inner (lower) trigram is ☷ ( kūn) field = earth, and its outer (upper) trigram is ☳ ( zhèn) shake = thunder.

Hexagram 17 

Hexagram 17 is named  (suí), "Following". Its inner (lower) trigram is ☳ ( zhèn) shake = thunder, and its outer (upper) trigram is ☱ ( duì) open = swamp.

Hexagram 18 

Hexagram 18 is named  (gǔ), "Correcting". Other variations include "work on what has been spoiled (decay)", "decaying" and "branch". Its inner (lower) trigram is ☴ ( xùn) ground = wind, and its outer (upper) trigram is ☶ bound = mountain. Gu is the name of a venom-based poison traditionally used in Chinese witchcraft.

Hexagram 19 

Hexagram 19 is named  (lín), "Nearing". Other variations include "approach" and "the forest". Its inner (lower) trigram is ☱ ( duì) open = swamp, and its outer (upper) trigram is ☷ ( kūn) field = earth.

Hexagram 20 

Hexagram 20 is named  (guān), "Viewing". Other variations include "contemplation (view)" and "looking up". Its inner (lower) trigram is ☷ ( kūn) field = earth, and its outer (upper) trigram is ☴ ( xùn) ground = wind.

Hexagram 21 

Hexagram 21 is named  (shì kè), "Gnawing Bite". Other variations include "biting through" and "biting and chewing". It may refer to teeth working together to bring coherence. Its inner (lower) trigram is ☳ ( zhèn) shake = thunder, and its outer (upper) trigram is ☲ ( lí) radiance = fire.

Hexagram 22 

Hexagram 22 is named  (bì), "Adorning", "bright", "grace", "lush", and "luxuriance". Its inner (lower) trigram is ☲ ( lí) radiance = fire, and its outer (upper) trigram is ☶ ( gèn) bound = mountain.

Hexagram 23 

Hexagram 23 is named  (bō), "Stripping". Other variations include "splitting apart", "flaying", "scalp", and "peel". This may allude to removal of something. Its inner (lower) trigram is ☷ ( kūn) field = earth, and its outer (upper) trigram is ☶ ( gèn) bound = mountain.

Hexagram 24 

Hexagram 24 is named  (fù), "Returning". Other variations include "return (the turning point)". Its inner (lower) trigram is ☳ ( zhèn) shake = thunder, and its outer (upper) trigram is ☷ ( kūn) field = earth.

Hexagram 25 

Hexagram 25 is named  (wú wàng), "Without Embroiling". Other variations include "innocence (the unexpected)" and "pestilence". Its inner (lower) trigram is ☳ ( zhèn) shake = thunder, and its outer (upper) trigram is ☰ ( qián) force = heaven.

Hexagram 26 

Hexagram 26 is named  (dà xù), "Great Accumulating". Other variations include "the taming power of the great", "great storage", and "potential energy". Its inner (lower) trigram is ☰ ( qián) force = heaven, and its outer (upper) trigram is ☶ ( gèn) bound = mountain.

Hexagram 27 

Hexagram 27 is named  (yí), "Swallowing". Other variations include "the corners of the mouth (providing nourishment)", "jaws" and "comfort/security". Its inner (lower) trigram is ☳ ( zhèn) shake = thunder, and its outer (upper) trigram is ☶ ( gèn) bound = mountain.

Hexagram 28 

Hexagram 28 is named  (dà guò), "Great Exceeding". Other variations include "preponderance of the great", "great surpassing" and "critical mass". Its inner (lower) trigram is ☴ ( xùn) ground = wind, and its outer (upper) trigram is ☱ ( duì) open = swamp.

Hexagram 29 

Hexagram 29 is named  (kǎn), "Gorge". Other variations include "the abyss" (in the oceanographic sense) and "repeated entrapment". Its inner (lower) trigram is ☵ ( kǎn) gorge = water, and its outer (upper) trigram is identical.

Hexagram 30 

Hexagram 30 is named  (lí), "Radiance". Other variations include "the clinging, fire" and "the net". Its inner (lower) trigram is ☲ ( lí) radiance = fire, and its outer (upper) trigram is identical. The origin of the character has its roots in symbols of long-tailed birds such as the peacock or the legendary phoenix.

Hexagram 31 

Hexagram 31 is named  (xián), "Conjoining". Other variations include "influence (wooing)", "feelings", "being affected", and "reciprocity". Its inner (lower) trigram is ☶ ( gèn) bound = mountain, and its outer (upper) trigram is ☱ ( duì) open = swamp.

Hexagram 32 

Hexagram 32 is named  (héng), "Persevering". Other variations include "duration" and "constancy". Its inner (lower) trigram is ☴ ( xùn) ground = wind, and its outer (upper) trigram is ☳ ( zhèn) shake = thunder.

Hexagram 33 

Hexagram 33 is named  (dùn), "Retiring". Other variations include "retreat" and "yielding". Its inner (lower) trigram is ☶ ( gèn) bound = mountain, and its outer (upper) trigram is ☰ ( qián) force = heaven.

Hexagram 34 

Hexagram 34 is named  (dà zhuàng), "Great Invigorating". Other variations include "the power of the great" and "great maturity". Its inner (lower) trigram is ☰ ( qián) force = heaven, and its outer (upper) trigram is ☳ ( zhèn) shake = thunder.

Hexagram 35 

Hexagram 35 is named  (jìn), "Prospering". Other variations include "progress" and "aquas". Its inner (lower) trigram is ☷ ( kūn) field = earth, and its outer (upper) trigram is ☲ ( lí) radiance = fire.

Hexagram 36 

Hexagram 36 is named  (míng yí), "Darkening of the Light". Other variations include "brilliance injured" and "intelligence hidden". Its inner (lower) trigram is ☲ ( lí) radiance = fire, and its outer (upper) trigram is ☷ ( kūn) field = earth.

Hexagram 37 

Hexagram 37 is named  (jiā rén), "Dwelling People". Other variations include "the family (the clan)" and "family members". Its inner (lower) trigram is ☲ ( lí) radiance = fire, and its outer (upper) trigram is ☴ ( xùn) ground = wind.

Hexagram 38 

Hexagram 38 is named  (kuí), "Polarising". Other variations include "opposition" and "perversion". The symbol 睽 also means separated, estranged, and stare. Its inner (lower) trigram is ☱ ( duì) open = swamp, and its outer (upper) trigram is ☲ ( lí) radiance = fire.

Hexagram 39 

Hexagram 39 is named  (jiǎn), "Limping". Other variations include "obstruction" and "afoot". Its inner (lower) trigram is ☶ ( gèn) bound = mountain, and its outer (upper) trigram is ☵ ( kǎn) gorge = water.

Hexagram 40 

Hexagram 40 is named  (xiè), "Taking-Apart". Other variations include "deliverance" and "untangled". Its inner (lower) trigram is ☵ ( kǎn) gorge = water, and its outer (upper) trigram is ☳ ( zhèn) shake = thunder.

Hexagram 41 

Hexagram 41 is named  (sǔn), "Diminishing", "lose", "reduction", "remove", "damage", "decrease". Its inner (lower) trigram is ☱ ( duì) open = swamp, and its outer (upper) trigram is ☶ ( gèn) bound = mountain.

Hexagram 42 

Hexagram 42 is named  (yì), "Augmenting". Other variations include: increase, beneficial, useful. Its inner (lower) trigram is ☳ ( zhèn) shake = thunder, and its outer (upper) trigram is ☴ ( xùn) ground = wind.

Hexagram 43 

Hexagram 43 is named  (guài), "Displacement". Other variations include "resoluteness", "parting", and "break-through". Its inner (lower) trigram is ☰ ( qián) force = heaven, and its outer (upper) trigram is ☱ ( duì) open = swamp.

Hexagram 44 

Hexagram 44 is named  (gòu), "Coupling". Other variations include "coming to meet" and "meeting". Its inner (lower) trigram is ☴ ( xùn) ground = wind, and its outer (upper) trigram is ☰ ( qián) force = heaven.

Hexagram 45 

Hexagram 45 is named  (cuì), "Clustering", "gathering together (massing)" and "finished". Other meanings of the symbol: gather, assemble, collect, dense, thick, and collection. It may mean that it's good to get help or advice; for progress it's necessary to persevere. The group needs to be sustained. Its inner (lower) trigram is ☷ ( kūn) field = earth, and its outer (upper) trigram is ☱ ( duì) open = swamp.

Hexagram 46 

Hexagram 46 is named  (shēng), "Ascending". Other variations include "pushing upward". Its inner (lower) trigram is ☴ ( xùn) ground = wind, and its outer (upper) trigram is ☷ ( kūn) field = earth.

Hexagram 47 

Hexagram 47 is named  (kùn), "Confining". Other variations include "oppression (exhaustion)" and "entangled". Its inner (lower) trigram is ☵ ( kǎn) gorge = water, and its outer (upper) trigram is ☱ ( duì) open = swamp.

Hexagram 48 

Hexagram 48 is named  (jǐng), "Welling". Other variations include "the well". Its inner (lower) trigram is ☴ ( xùn) ground = wind, and its outer (upper) trigram is ☵ ( kǎn) gorge = water.

Hexagram 49 

Hexagram 49 is named  (gé), "Skinning". Other variations include "revolution (molting)" and "the bridle". Its inner (lower) trigram is ☲ ( lí) radiance = fire, and its outer (upper) trigram is ☱ ( duì) open = swamp.

Hexagram 50 

Hexagram 50 is named  (dǐng), "Holding". Other variations include "the cauldron". Its inner (lower) trigram is ☴ ( xùn) ground = wind, and its outer (upper) trigram is ☲ ( lí) radiance = fire.

Hexagram 51 

Hexagram 51 is named  (zhèn), "Shake","the arousing (shock, thunder)"; "thunder, excite, thrill, convulse, and tremor". The advice is to maintain one's concentration ("one did not lose the sacrificial wine in the ladle"). Its inner (lower) trigram is ☳ ( zhèn) shake = thunder, and its outer (upper) trigram is identical.

Hexagram 52 

Hexagram 52 is named  (gèn), "Bound". Other variations include "keeping still, mountain" and "stilling". The symbol also means, "blunt, tough, and chewy like hard leather". Its inner (lower) trigram is ☶ ( gèn) bound = mountain, and its outer (upper) trigram is identical.

Hexagram 53 

Hexagram 53 is named  (jiàn), "Infiltrating". Other variations include "development (gradual progress)" and "advancement". Its inner (lower) trigram is ☶ ( gèn) bound = mountain, and its outer (upper) trigram is ☴ ( xùn) ground = wind.

Hexagram 54 

Hexagram 54 is named  (guī mèi), "Converting the Maiden". Other variations include "the marrying maiden" and "returning maiden". Marrying younger sister. Not being in a position to make things happen one's own way. Trying to anyway will only bring trouble. Its inner (lower) trigram is ☱ ( duì) open = swamp, and its outer (upper) trigram is ☳ ( zhèn) shake = thunder.

Hexagram 55 

Hexagram 55 is named  (fēng), "Abounding". Other variations include "abundance" and "fullness". Its inner (lower) trigram is ☲ ( lí) radiance = fire, and its outer (upper) trigram is ☳ ( zhèn) shake = thunder.

Hexagram 56 

Hexagram 56 is named  (lǚ), "Sojourning". Other variations include "the wanderer" and "traveling". Its inner (lower) trigram is ☶ ( gèn) bound = mountain, and its outer (upper) trigram is ☲ ( lí) radiance = fire.

Hexagram 57 

Hexagram 57 is named  (xùn), "Ground". Other variations include "the gentle (the penetrating, wind)" and "calculations". Its inner (lower) trigram is ☴ ( xùn) ground = wind, and its outer (upper) trigram is identical.

Hexagram 58 

Hexagram 58 is named  (duì), "Open", "exchange" "the joyous, lake" and "usurpation". The symbol "兌" means exchange, add, against, and convert. Its inner (lower) trigram is ☱ ( duì) open = swamp, and its outer (upper) trigram is identical.

Hexagram 59 

Hexagram 59 is named  (huàn), "Dispersing". Other variations include "dispersion (dissolution)" and "dispersal". The symbol means dissipate, dissolve, vanish. Its inner (lower) trigram is ☵ ( kǎn) gorge = water, and its outer (upper) trigram is ☴ ( xùn) ground = wind.

Hexagram 60 

Hexagram 60 is named  (jié), "Articulating". Other variations include "limitation" and "moderation". Its inner (lower) trigram is ☱ ( duì) open = swamp, and its outer (upper) trigram is ☵ ( kǎn) gorge = water.

Hexagram 61 

Hexagram 61 is named  (zhōng fú), "Center Returning", "inner trust", "inner truth" and "central return". Its inner (lower) trigram is ☱ ( duì) open = swamp, and its outer (upper) trigram is ☴ ( xùn) ground = wind.

Hexagram 62 

Hexagram 62 is named  (xiǎo guò), "Small Exceeding". Other variations include "preponderance of the small" and "small surpassing". Its inner (lower) trigram is ☶ ( gèn) bound = mountain, and its outer (upper) trigram is ☳ ( zhèn) shake = thunder.

Hexagram 63 

Hexagram 63 is named  (jì jì), "Already Fording". Other variations include "after completion" and "already completed" or "already done". Its inner (lower) trigram is ☲ ( lí) radiance = fire, and its outer (upper) trigram is ☵ ( kǎn) gorge = water.

Hexagram 64 

Hexagram 64 is named  (wèi jì), "Not Yet Fording". Other variations include "before completion" and "not yet completed". Its inner (lower) trigram is ☵ ( kǎn) gorge = water, and its outer (upper) trigram is ☲ ( lí) radiance = fire.

References

External links
  Wilhelm, Baynes “The I Ching or Book of Changes” (Association Française des Professeurs de Chinois)

I Ching